Synthetic fibers or synthetic fibres (in British English; see spelling differences) are fibers made by humans through chemical synthesis, as opposed to natural fibers that are directly derived from living organisms, such as plants (like cotton) or fur from animals. They are the result of extensive research by scientists to replicate naturally occurring animal and plant fibers. In general, synthetic fibers are created by extruding fiber-forming materials through spinnerets, forming a fiber. These are called synthetic or artificial fibers. The word polymer comes from a Greek prefix "poly" which means "many" and suffix "mer" which means "single units". (Note: each single unit of a polymer is called a monomer).

Early experiments 

The first fully synthetic fiber was glass. Joseph Swan invented one of the first artificial fibers in the early 1880s; today it would be called semisynthetic in precise usage. His fiber was drawn from a cellulose liquid, formed by chemically modifying the fiber contained in tree bark. The synthetic fiber produced through this process was chemically similar in its potential applications to the carbon filament Swan had developed for his incandescent light bulb, but Swan soon realized the potential of the fiber to revolutionize textile manufacturing. In 1885, he unveiled fabrics he had manufactured from his synthetic material at the International Inventions Exhibition in London.

The next step was taken by Hilaire de Chardonnet, a French engineer and industrialist, who invented the first artificial silk, which he called "Chardonnet silk". In the late 1870s, Chardonnet was working with Louis Pasteur on a remedy to the epidemic that was destroying French silkworms. Failure to clean up a spill in the darkroom resulted in Chardonnet's discovery of nitrocellulose as a potential replacement for real silk. Realizing the value of such a discovery, Chardonnet began to develop his new product, which he displayed at the Paris Exhibition of 1889.  Chardonnet's material was extremely flammable, and subsequently replaced with other, more stable materials.

Commercial products

The first successful process was developed in 1894 by English chemist Charles Frederick Cross, and his collaborators Edward John Bevan and Clayton Beadle. They named the fiber "viscose", because the reaction product of carbon disulfide and cellulose in basic conditions gave a highly viscous solution of xanthate. The first commercial viscose rayon was produced by the UK company Courtaulds in 1905. The name "rayon" was adopted in 1924, with "viscose" being used for the viscous organic liquid used to make both rayon and cellophane. A similar product known as cellulose acetate was discovered in 1865. Rayon and acetate are both artificial fibers, but not truly synthetic, being made from wood.

Nylon, the first synthetic fiber in the "fully synthetic" sense of that term, was developed by Wallace Carothers, an American researcher at the chemical firm DuPont in the 1930s. It soon made its debut in the United States as a replacement for silk, just in time for the introduction of rationing during World War II. Its novel use as a material for women's stockings overshadowed more practical uses, such as a replacement for the silk in parachutes and other military uses like ropes.

The first polyester fiber was patented in Britain in 1928 by the International General Electric company. It was also produced by British chemists working at the Calico Printers' Association, John Rex Whinfield and James Tennant Dickson, in 1941. They produced and patented one of the first polyester fibers which they named Terylene, also known as Dacron, equal to or surpassing nylon in toughness and resilience. ICI and DuPont went on to produce their own versions of the fiber.

The world production of synthetic fibers was 55.2 million tonnes in 2014.

Descriptions

Synthetic fibers account for about half of all fiber usage, with applications in every field of fiber and textile technology. Although many classes of fibers based on synthetic polymers have been evaluated as potentially valuable commercial products, four of them - nylon, polyester, acrylic and polyolefin - dominate the market. These four account for approximately 98 percent by volume of synthetic fiber production, with polyester alone accounting for around 60 percent.

Pros
Synthetic fibers are more durable than most natural fibers and will readily pick-up different dyes. In addition, many synthetic fibers offer consumer-friendly functions such as stretching, waterproofing and stain resistance. Sunlight, moisture, and oils from human skin cause all fibers to break down and wear away. Natural fibers tend to be much more sensitive than synthetic blends. This is mainly because natural products are biodegradable. Natural fibers are susceptible to larval insect infestation; synthetic fibers are not a good food source for fabric-damaging insects. 

Compared to natural fibers, many synthetic fibers are more water-resistant and stain-resistant. Some are even specially enhanced to withstand damage from water or stains.

Cons

Most of synthetic fibers' disadvantages are related to their low melting temperature:
 Mono-fibers do not trap air pockets like cotton and thus provide poor insulation.
 Synthetic fibers burn more rapidly than natural fibers.
 Prone to heat damage like damage by hot washing.
 Melt relatively easily.
 More electrostatic charge is generated by rubbing than with natural fibers.
 Some consumers claim that textiles made with synthetic fibers are less skin-friendly or may cause discomfort over long periods of wear.
 Non-biodegradable or far less biodegradable in comparison to natural fibers.
 Most synthetic fibers absorb very little moisture and thus may become sticky when the body sweats.
 Synthetic fibers are a source of microplastic pollution from laundry machines.

Common synthetic fibers
Common synthetic fibers include:
 Nylon (1931)
 Modacrylic (1949)
 Olefin (1949)
 Acrylic (1950)
 Polyester (1953)

Specialty synthetic fibers include:

 Rayon (1894) artificial silk
 Vinyon (1939)
 Saran (1941)
 Spandex (1959)
 Vinalon (1939)
 Aramids (1961) - known as Nomex, Kevlar and Twaron
 Modal (1960s)
 Dyneema/Spectra (1979)
 PBI (Polybenzimidazole fiber) (1983)
 Sulfar (1983)
 Lyocell (1992) (artificial, not synthetic)
 PLA (2002)
 M-5 (PIPD fiber)
 Orlon
 Zylon (PBO fiber)
 Vectran (TLCP fiber) made from Vectra LCP polymer
 Derclon used in manufacture of rugs

Other synthetic materials used in fibers include:
 Acrylonitrile rubber (1930)

Modern fibers that are made from older artificial materials include:
 Glass fiber (1938) is used for:
 industrial, automotive, and home insulation (glass wool)
 reinforcement of composite materials (glass-reinforced plastic, glass fiber reinforced concrete)
 specialty papers in battery separators and filtration
 Metallic fiber (1946) is used for:
 adding metallic properties to clothing for the purpose of fashion (usually made with composite plastic and metal foils)
 elimination and prevention of static charge build-up
 conducting electricity to transmit information
 conduction of heat

See also
 Artificial turf
 Elasterell
 Rope
 Delustrant

References

Further reading 
 The original source of this article and much of the synthetic fiber articles (copied with permission) is Whole Earth magazine, No. 90, Summer 1997. www.wholeearth.com